Bacote is a surname. Notable people with the surname include:

Clarence Albert Bacote (1906–1981), American historian and activist
Rufus Herve Bacote (1890–1930), American physician and World War I veteran

English-language surnames